The Yamaha SS 125 is a rechristened version of the Yamaha Gladiator. It is a 125 cc motorcycle, produced by India Yamaha Motor.

In the beginning of March 2008, Yamaha introduced two new models of the Gladiator, Type RS and Type SS. In August 2010, Yamaha discontinued the Gladiator and launched the SS 125. The SS 125 had minor changes in the chassis which shortened its dimensions and made it lighter by 3 kg. It also features a high-flow paper air-filter, racing engine cowl and a stylish exhaust muffler.

Features and specifications

References

Gladiator
Motorcycles introduced in 2006